Esmevânio Kialonda Gaspar (born 27 September 1997), sometimes known as just Gaspar, is an Angolan footballer who plays as a defender for the Portuguese club Estrela.

Career
Gaspar began his playing career with the Angolan club Sagrada Esperança, where he played for 4 seasons. On 1 August 2022, he transferred to the Liga Portugal 2 club Estrela.

Career statistics

Club

Notes

International

References

1997 births
Living people
Angolan footballers
Angola international footballers
Association football defenders
G.D. Sagrada Esperança players
C.F. Estrela da Amadora players
Girabola players
Liga Portugal 2 players
Angolan expatriate footballers
Angolan expatriates in Portugal
Expatriate footballers in Portugal